Pyi Taw Pyan was a Burmese Lethwei fighter, well-known during the British rule in Burma. He became champion and owner of U Ba's cup in 1931.

Lethwei career 
In 1931, Pyi Taw Pyan was a contender and winner of Minister of Home Affairs U Ba's cup and medal. He reached the semi-finals together with La Yaung, "The Flying Indian" Kular Pyan and Ba Aye.

He entered the tournament again in 1932 to defend his honour. During the tournament, in an out-of-bracket match, he challenged a rival fighter to a fight until death without referees. Pyi Taw Pyan had learned that Kyar Aye Sein had won his quarter-final match by striking his downed opponent. Highly frowned upon, it prompted Pyi Taw Pyan to immediately storm the ring and challenge Kyar Aye Sein. The match was held the next day and converted to a gambling match where 30 Kyats was up for grabs for the winner. After an initial 4 rounds of fighting, Kyar Aye Sein's stalling was becoming so apparent that the referee stopped the match and announced Pyi Taw Pyan as the winner. The total match time was 60 minutes. Since tensions rose and Kyar Aye Sein started throwing tantrums, the ringside officials agreed to split the wager where Pyi Taw Pyan was awarded 20 Kyats and his opponent 10 Kyats. Pyi Taw Pyan eventually lost to Phyu Lay Gyi in the semi-finals of the tournament.

On January 25, 1933 Pyi Taw Pyan fought B.A Sein at King Carnival Stadium along Dalhousie Street in Yangon. After B.A Sein gave up in round four due to a lack of stamina, Pyi Taw Pyan called out English boxing champion George Goudie, title holder and lightweight champion of Burma. On that same evening Kyar Aye Sein offered a challenge to Kid D'Silva, featherweight champion of India and Burma. The sport of professional boxing enjoyed a short revival at this time, with George Goudie and Kid D'Silva at the forefront.

In 1935 Pyi Taw Pyan fought Htee Latt. After the fight, Pyi Taw Pyan experienced a case of hematemesis, attributed to the wearing of talismans and charms by Htee Latt during the fight. On May 2nd 1935 first class boxers Min Khaung and Htee Latt fought in celebration of King George’s 25 years of reign. Min Khaung recalled the fight that Htee Latt had fought against Pyi Taw Pyan and thus insisted his opponent remove his charms before their fight.

His last recorded fight happened shortly before the invasion of the Japanese in 1941. He fought Min Khaung at Kandawgyi Lake which has been a popular area for lethwei fights up until this day.

Titles and accomplishments 
 Championships
 Chief Justice U Ba's Championship winner (1931)
 Other accomplishments
 Minister of Home Affairs U Ba's Championship semi-finalist (1932)
 "Champion of Burma" gold medal, awarded by Sir Archibald Douglas Cochrane, Governor of British Burma

Lethwei record 

|- style="background:#c5d2ea;"
| 1941-04-27 || Draw || align="left" | Min Khaung || Kandawgyi Lake || Rangoon, Burma || Draw ||  || 
|- style="background:#cfc;"
| 1933-01-25 || Win || align="left" | B.A. Sein || King Carnival Stadium || Rangoon, Burma || TKO || 4 ||
|- style="background:#fbb;"
| 1932-12-31 || Loss || align="left" | Phyu Lay Gyi (Hnit Char) || U Ba's Championship semi-final || Rangoon, Burma || KO ||  || 
|- style="background:#c5d2ea;"
| 1932-12-28 || Draw || align="left" | Kyar Aye Sein (Pegu) || Hare Krishna Pilay Hall || Rangoon, Burma || Draw || 4 || 60:00
|-
! style=background:white colspan=9 |
|- style="background:#cfc;"
| 1932-12-27 || Win || align="left" | Doe Phyu Kalay || U Ba's Championship quarter-final || Rangoon, Burma || KO ||  ||
|- style="background:#cfc;"
| 1932-12-24 || Win || align="left" | Phyu Lay Gyi (Hnit Char) || Hare Krishna Pilay Hall || Rangoon, Burma || KO || 2 ||
|- style="background:#cfc;"
| 1931-10-19 || Win || align="left" | Ba Aye || U Ba's Championship final || Burma || KO ||  ||
|-
! style=background:white colspan=9 |
|- style="background:#cfc;"
| 1931-10-18 || Win || align="left" | La Yaung || U Ba's Championship semi-final || Burma || KO ||  ||
|-

References

Burmese Lethwei practitioners